During the 1981–82 English football season, Everton F.C. competed in the Football League First Division. They finished 8th in the table with 64 points.

Final league table

Results

Football League First Division

FA Cup

League Cup

Squad

Steve McMahon	
Mark Higgins	
Mike Lyons	
Trevor Ross	
Graeme Sharp	
Neville Southall	
Kevin Ratcliffe	
Alan Irvine	
Billy Wright	
Gary Stevens	
Adrian Heath	
Mike Walsh	
Jim Arnold
Alan Biley	
Peter Eastoe	
Kevin Richardson	
Alan Ainscow	
Paul Lodge	
Brian Borrows	
John Bailey	
Eamonn O'Keefe	
Mickey Thomas	
Mick Ferguson	
Joe McBride	
Asa Hartford	
Howard Kendall	
Stuart Rimmer

References

1981-82
Everton
Everton F.C. season